The Charlemont Clinic was a private medical clinic in Dublin, Ireland.

History
The clinic was established in 1989 on the site of the former Saint Ultan's Children's Hospital.

Closure and sale
Due to decreasing revenue, the 0.38 hectare city centre site was offered for sale in 2014 at €5 million. It was purchased by U+I Group for €7.1 million and later sold to the Dalata Hotel Group for €11.9 million. In 2016, Dalata obtained planning permission for a 181-bedroom 4 star hotel on the site, which opened as the Clayton Hotel Charlemont on 23 November 2018.

References

1989 establishments in Ireland
2014 disestablishments in Ireland
Organizations established in 1989
Organizations disestablished in 2014
Medical and health organisations based in the Republic of Ireland
Organisations based in Dublin (city)
20th century in Dublin (city)
21st century in Dublin (city)
Health centers
1990s in Dublin (city)